Herefordshire Primary Care Trust, also known as NHS Herefordshire was an NHS organisation in England which is responsible for health care services in the county of Herefordshire. The trust covered the city of Hereford itself, as well as the other towns and villages which make up the county, including Bromyard, Ross-on-Wye, Ledbury and Leominster.

It was abolished in April 2013.

External links
 NHS Herefordshire website

Defunct NHS trusts
Health in Herefordshire